Viktoriya Brigadnaya (born 4 August 1980) is a Turkmenistan athlete. She competed in the women's triple jump at the 2000 Summer Olympics.

References

1980 births
Living people
Athletes (track and field) at the 2000 Summer Olympics
Turkmenistan female triple jumpers
Olympic athletes of Turkmenistan
Place of birth missing (living people)
Asian Games medalists in athletics (track and field)
Asian Games bronze medalists for Turkmenistan
World Athletics Championships athletes for Turkmenistan
Athletes (track and field) at the 1998 Asian Games
Medalists at the 1998 Asian Games